In geology, metasedimentary rock is a type of metamorphic rock. Such a rock was first formed through the deposition and solidification of sediment. Then, the rock was buried underneath subsequent rock and was subjected to high pressures and temperatures, causing the rock to recrystallize. The overall composition of a metasedimentary rock can be used to identify the original sedimentary rock, even where they have been subject to high-grade metamorphism and intense deformation.

Types of metasedimentary rocks

See also

References

 
Metamorphic petrology